Neumann's warbler (Hemitesia neumanni), also known as Neumann's short-tailed warbler, is a species of bird in the family Cettiidae.
It is found in Democratic Republic of the Congo, Rwanda, and Uganda. Its natural habitat is subtropical or tropical moist montane forest.

Taxonomy
Neumann's warbler was formally described in 1908 by the English zoologist Water Rothschild from specimens collected in a forested area west of Lake Tanganyika. He proposed the binomial name Sylvietta neumanni. Neumann's warbler is now placed with the pale-footed bush warbler in the genus Hemitesia that was introduced in 1948 by James Chaplin. The genus name combines the Ancient Greek hēmi- meaning "half-" or "small" with the genus Teslia that had been introduced by Brian Hodgson in 1837. The specific epithet neumanni was chosen to honour the German ornithologist Oscar Neumann. The species is monotypic: no subspecies are recognised.

Neumann's warbler is the only species in the family Cettiidae that is found in Africa.

Distribution and habitat
This warbler lives in thick undergrowth of montane forest, often near streams, in eastern Democratic Republic of the Congo, southwest Uganda, western Rwanda and western Burundi.

Description
It has a large head with a distinctive striped pattern and a very short tail. The broad supercilium is grey-brown and present in front of the eye as a dull greenish and white pattern.

The voice is a loud song ("tee-tiyoo-tee", "tee-tyer-tyii", "tyoowi-tyee", "tee-teeyoo-tyoowi" or "tay-tiyoo-tay") intermixing with almost inaudible lipsing notes, and is repeated at regular intervals.

References

Neumann's warbler
Birds of Sub-Saharan Africa
Neumann's warbler
Neumann's warbler
Taxonomy articles created by Polbot
Taxobox binomials not recognized by IUCN